Craig Trively Enoch (born April 3, 1950) is a former associate justice of the Texas Supreme Court, having served from 1993 until his retirement in 2003.

Career
Before service on the Supreme Court, he was chief justice of the Texas state Fifth District Court of Appeals located in Dallas. Justice Enoch is currently a managing member of Enoch Kever PLLC in Austin, Texas.

Personal life
Enoch is the son of the former Margery Trively and Don Enoch, who served as the Mayor of Wichita, Kansas, from 1969 until 1970. He is married to the former Kathryn Barker (born 1951).

References

1950 births
Living people
Justices of the Texas Supreme Court
Texas Republicans
People from Dallas
People from Austin, Texas
Texas lawyers